Fort Standish can refer to:
Fort Standish (Boston, Massachusetts), a former fort in Boston
Fort Standish (Plymouth, Massachusetts), a former fort in Plymouth